KWRZ (92.3 FM) is a radio station licensed to Canyonville, Oregon, United States. The station is owned by Brooke Communications.

On December 5, 2019, KWRZ changed their format from classical to a simulcast of sports-formatted KSKR 1490 AM Roseburg, following a sale from the University of Oregon to Brooke Communications.

References

External links

WRZ
Douglas County, Oregon
Canyonville, Oregon
1990 establishments in Oregon
CBS Sports Radio stations
Sports radio stations in the United States